"The Island" is a 1985 song by an Irish musician Paul Brady, who comes from Strabane in County Tyrone.

The song appeared on the album 'Back to the Centre', and features Kenny Craddock on piano. The only other instrument is a guitar solo by Phil Palmer   The album was produced by long time Brady collaborator Ian Maidman (later known as  Jennifer Maidman).

The start of the song compares the tragic events of the Lebanese Civil War with the Troubles in Northern Ireland in the 1980s. Comments are made on activities in Northern Ireland:
"They're rising banners over by the markets /
Whitewashing slogans on the shipyard wall".
"The Markets" is a well known Republican area surrounding St George's Market in Belfast, and the shipyard is that of Harland and Wolff in East Belfast, near a Loyalist area. The song then compares the peace and serenity of making love on the island with the hypocrisy of some religious leaders and the tragedy of young people being "sacrificed" (on both sides) for political beliefs.

The song was referred to pejoratively through a refrain of "the island" in Christy Moore's song The Other Side, a song in support of those detained in Long Kesh.  However, Christy Moore later toned down the lyrics in this song and rerecorded it in 2011 as Tyrone Boys.

Some claim it was written as a condemnation of the 1987 Remembrance Day Massacre. This is impossible, of course, as at the time of its recording, the bombings were not to take place for another two years. There are elements of the song, however, which could be construed as Anti-Terrorism.

References

External links
 Newspaper interview with Paul Brady

1985 songs
Paul Brady songs
Songs about Ireland
Songs about The Troubles (Northern Ireland)